Town Hall railway station may refer to:

Town Hall railway station, Melbourne
Town Hall railway station, Sydney